Vrútky ((rare)) is a town in northern Slovakia, close to the city of Martin. It lies in the historic Turiec region.

Geography
The town lies at the confluence of Váh and the Turiec, in the Turčianska kotlina, near the Malá Fatra mountain range.

Etymology
The name is derived from a plural form of Proto-Slavic *vьrǫ tъkъ > vrútok meaning "a hot spring".

History
The town was first mentioned in 1255 as villa Vrutk. However, a settlement had previously existed, and had the old Slavic name vrutok. By the end of the 13th century, the settlement had been divided into Dolné Vrútky and Horné Vrútky. By 1332, the settlement gained independence and in 1809, the town had almost 300 inhabitants. The construction of the Košice-Bohumín Railway in 1870 and the Salgótarján in 1872, brought economic development and Vrútky gained the status of being a key railway junction. This new status was also reflected in the increased number of inhabitants, which rose from 915 in 1869, to 1,944 in 1880 and 4,345 in 1900. Between the years 1949-1954 and 1971-1990 the town was amalgamated with Martin under the name Martin-Vrútky. Vrútky regained independence in the year 1990, when it separated from Martin.

Demographics
According to the 2001 census, the town has 7,298 inhabitants; 96.01% of inhabitants are Slovaks, 1.33% Czechs 0.47% Roma and 0.33 Hungarians. This same census shows that Roman Catholics account for 50.34%, people with no religious affiliation account for 24.86% and Lutherans account for 19.01% of the total town population.

Twin towns — sister cities

Vrútky is twinned with:

 Bebra, Germany
 Fulnek, Czech Republic
 Łaziska Górne, Poland
 Nymburk, Czech Republic

Notable people
 Ján Bodenek – writer, translator
 Emanuel Böhm – politician, writer
 Radoslav Brzobohatý – film and television actor
 John D. Hertz – founded the Yellow Cab Company
 Zora Mintalová – Zubercová – ethnographer, historian and museologist
 Hana Zelinová – prose writer and dramatist
 František Zvarík - film and theater actor
 Tomáš Galis – Bishop of Zilina

See also
Gymnázium Vrútky

References

External links

 Official website 

Cities and towns in Slovakia